is a private junior college in Nishinomiya, Hyōgo, Japan, established in 1964.

External links
 Official website 

Japanese junior colleges
Educational institutions established in 1964
Private universities and colleges in Japan
Universities and colleges in Hyōgo Prefecture
1964 establishments in Japan